"The Bright Ambassadors of Morning" is a song and single by the British new prog band Pure Reason Revolution from the mini-album Cautionary Tales for the Brave. The title refers to lyrics from the Pink Floyd song, Echoes.

It is the highest-charting single effort of the band to date, reaching number 68 in the official UK singles chart.

Track listing
"The Bright Ambassadors of Morning" - 11:50

References

Pure Reason Revolution songs
2005 singles
Songs written by Jon Courtney
2005 songs
Sony BMG singles